The 2015 NACAM Rally Championship is the eighth season of the NACAM Rally Championship. This championship was the FIA regional rally championship for the North America and Central America (NACAM) region. The season began 13 April in Oaxaca, Mexico, and ended 27 November in Jamaica, after seven events.

The calendar has undergone a major change for 2015. Peru has been dropped as has 2014 cancelations, Guyana and Venezuela. Colombia, who stepped in to provide three championship events in 2014 after cancellations will not host an event in 2015. A second Mexican event, the RAC 1000 Rally, has been added as well as debutant host countries, Panama and the United States who plans to host the third round in the state of West Virginia.

Event calendar and results

The 2015 NACAM Rally Championship was as follows:

Championship standings
The 2015 NACAM Rally Championship points are as follows:

References

External links

NACAM Rally Championship
NACAM
NACAM Rally Championship
NACAM Rally Championship